The Iarnród Éireann (IÉ) / Northern Ireland Railways 201 Class locomotives are the newest and most powerful diesel locomotives operating in Ireland and were built between 1994 and 1995 by General Motors Diesel. A freight version, the EMD Series 66, with the same engine, is used on privately operated European mainline freight duties.

History
By the early 1990s, the locomotives operating passenger services in Ireland were becoming increasingly obsolete, with the newest type in service being the 071 Class introduced in 1976. The economic boom in Ireland in the mid-1990s allowed Iarnród Éireann to begin significant investment in the infrastructure of the railways, which began with an order for 32 brand new express locomotives from GM-EMD. Northern Ireland Railways also purchased 2. The first were delivered in 1994, with deliveries continuing until 1995.

To allow clearance tests and driver training to commence in advance of the delivery of the main order of 201s, it was decided to transport the first locomotive, number 201, to Dublin by air. An Antonov An-124 was used to transport the locomotive from London, Ontario to Dublin Airport, arriving on Thursday 9 June 1994. The first light-engine test run operated from Inchicore works to Kildare on the Tuesday 14.

Unfortunately, the locomotives have had a chequered service history. The authors of Jane's Train Recognition Guide noted that IÉ had had problems with engine fires and bogie cracks.

Technical details
Main Generator Assembly: AR8PHEH/CA6
Head End Alternator (HEP): Dayton-Phoenix, model E7145, 438 kVA, 220/380VAC, 3-phase, 50 Hz
Standby HEP: 220 kVA from AR8, available only when stationary
Auxiliary Generator: 5A-8147, 
Air Compressor/Exhauster: Gardner Denver, model WLPA9B
Multiple Working: All IÉ & NIR EMD locos
Push Pull Working: Locos 206-209 & 215-234
Curve Negotiation Capability:
Yard: 
Running line: 
Coupled to train:

Equipment new to IÉ locos
Air Dryer
Teloc 2200 Event Recorder
Electrically heated windscreens
Active noise control in both cabs
Enclosed body style, last seen on 1950s Metro-Vic A and C Classes
Head End Power (HEP)
This system supplied AC power to the train for heating, battery charging, etc. and was intended to replace the Mark 2 & Mark 3 Generator Vans used at the time. In the event HEP was only used on the Enterprise cross-border De Dietrich service. HEP is no longer used due to noise while the train is in station, and reliability issues running the prime mover at high speed constantly. Four Mark 3 generator vans remain in use on the Enterprise service. The later CAF-built Mark 4 sets include their own generators in the Driving Van Trailer (DVT).
EM2000 digital traction computer
Train (carriage) door control
D43 Traction Motors
Super Series wheel creep control 
Cab mounted electronic fuel gauges
Fire suppression system, FM200 extinguisher

Variants
There are three versions within the Class 201:
201 to 205 & 210 to 214
Fixed buffers, shackle coupling
215, 217 to 226-, 229, 232 and 234
Retractable buffers, automatic or shackle coupling, 
Push-pull capability, electronic fuel gauges
206 to 209, 216, 227, 228, 230, 231 & 233
Retractable buffers, automatic or shackle coupling, 
Push-pull capability, electronic fuel gauges
NIR train radio and TPWS/AWS for cross-border service.
HaslerRail 2500 Event recorder

Fleet

InterCity
Today push-pull equipped members of the 201 class operate the only passenger locomotive hauled services in the Republic of Ireland between Dublin and Cork. They operate with Mark 4 carriages which were introduced to the route in 2006/2007. The current livery, which primarily consists of green and silver, was introduced in 2006. All locomotives have full yellow ends to enhance visibility.

Non push-pull locomotives were withdrawn from service because Mark 4 carriages operate a push-pull system and rolling stock on other InterCity routes was replaced by 22000 Class DMUs. The only other locomotive-hauled service (also push-pull) is the Enterprise cross-border service to Belfast which is detailed below.

Enterprise
The Enterprise is a cross-border passenger service between Dublin and Belfast operated by Iarnród Éireann and Northern Ireland Railways. This is also a locomotive-hauled service and operates a similar push-pull system like services to Cork. As this is a jointly operated service, it is marketed as the "Enterprise" and the coaching stock and locomotives carry a separate livery to either operator's own services. It consists of light grey with a purple and red strip. Locomotives also have full yellow ends to enhance visibility.

As the service is shared, locomotives (8)208 and (8)209 are owned by Northern Ireland Railways. The coaching stock is owned by operators, Iarnród Éireann own the odd numbered coaches and NIR own the even numbered coaches.

In addition, Iarnród Éireann introduced four former Mark 3 generator vans, in September 2012, to operate this route, in a bid to improve reliability of the service and reduce maintenance costs.  Previously, the service operated with head end power and this caused regular locomotive failures, increased wear and tear and also contributed to locomotive 230 being removed from service in June 2013 after an engine fire, while operating a passenger service with HEP in operation.

Freight
201 Class locomotives also operate some freight services as required. There is a container flow between Dublin Port and Ballina.

Since 2016, some 201 Class locomotives have operated increased freight services, as the weight and length of some freight services was increased, due to customer demand.

Common livery
Locomotives 231 and 233 are painted in a common livery, which consists of light grey with a black stripe. The reason for this is that they are assigned for Enterprise duties and as part of the refurbishment of the Enterprise service, in 2015-2016, only six were given the full livery. Prior to this, some of those given the current livery had previously had the InterCity livery. As part of Iarnród Éireann's logo change, all InterCity 201's carry the new Iarnród Éireann logo, which includes the Irish flag, and for operational and safety reasons they do not operate cross border services, so a common colour scheme was adopted. After the cancellation of the Belmond Grand Hibernian in Ireland, locomotive 216 has been used on both Enterprise and Intercity services, it remains in the blue livery of the Belmond Grand Hibernian as of February 2023.

List of locomotive names
The entire class is named after Irish rivers, with the IÉ locomotives carrying two nameplates, one in Irish and one in English, on each side of the locomotive. As 208 and 209 are owned by Northern Ireland Railways, they carry English language only nameplates. The nameplates are trapezium shaped, with the names in upper case.

Current operations
All of the non push-pull capable locomotives (201–205 and 210–214) were placed in storage at Inchicore during 2009, the last being 214 in July 2009. This was due to the withdrawal of the Mark 3 fleet and their replacement with 22000 Class DMUs on the vast majority of passenger services. This left only the Mark 4 Dublin–Cork services and the cross-border Enterprise service (with De Dietrich rolling stock) as the only locomotive hauled passenger services operated by Iarnród Éireann.

The reduction in the number of locomotive hauled passenger workings, combined with the withdrawal of older GM locomotives, has seen 201 Class locomotives used on freight workings, whilst four push-pull capable units were transferred to join the original four dedicated locomotives in use on the Enterprise.

In 2010 Iarnród Éireann planned to store some of its remaining push-pull capable Mark 3 coaches, which could potentially have been used with 201 Class locomotives to enhance Enterprise's service. However, most Mark 3 carriages were scrapped during 2013 and 2014.
A fleet of 10 Mark 3 coaches were sold to Belmond Grand Hibernian, while 216 and 225 were earmarked be returned to service to handle the extra traffic generated by Belmond operation. In May 2016, 216 returned to service in Belmond livery, and has operated the Grand Hibernian almost exclusively since that time.

225 was stopped after a fatal level crossing collision in 2010 which caused extensive underframe damage. On the 24th of October 2019 225 returned to traffic on IWT duties. After extensive testing, was returned to passenger service on 8 November 2019.

In October 2011 233 suffered bearing failure en route to Connolly station from Belfast. It was transported by road to Inchicore Railway Works

On 15 February 2016 two 201 Class locomotives (226 & 209) operated freight trials with a long train of 15 HOBS ballast wagons plus one un-powered loco, possibly assessing the loco's capabilities for future freight services.

In October 2016 Iarnród Éireann expressed an interest in seeking solutions to re-power most of the fleet during a mid-life refurbishment. The requirement was for floor-up engine and control gear solutions, which kept the existing cab controls and compatibility with the existing GM fleet and push/pull equipment. The body, cab controls, bogies, and traction motors would remain unchanged. 201 and 205 were brought in from storage for internal and external inspection, possibly in relation to this re-powering. The re-powering project was originally scheduled to begin in the first quarter of 2017, but was cancelled in early 2019.

In July 2017, 230 received some bodywork repairs  after it suffered significant damage, due to a fire in the HEP system in 2013. The loco has been in storage since.

In July 2020, 224 suffered a serious failure to its underframe. The official RAIU report, issued in July 2021, concluded that a weld repair to a non-structural bed plate had been unnecessarily applied to a structural chassis plate, causing an eventual structural failure of the locomotive.

It is worth noting that they cannot operate on the Larne line due to weight clearance.

Model
In the late 1990s, Model Irish Railways produced a resin bodyshell kit with nameplates, numbering, brass grills and the standard yellow / black livery line transfers.  Marks Models also released a resin kit for these locomotives in 00 gauge in c.2000.

In 2001, Murphy Models commissioned LIMA to produce an '00' gauge 201 model  loco. They were produced in IÉ orange (201, 216, 217, 219, 230) and Enterprise (206, 207, 208, 209) liveries, in batches of 300 (except 500 of #207).

In 2011 Murphy Models launched a completely new version of the 201, with all wheel drive, centre can motor and  preinstalled speaker.  This was released in IÉ orange (original and revised), Green Intercity and NIR blue  as well as NIR Enterprise original and revised.

Railtec Transfers  and Studio Scale Models  make transfers for the full range of 201 liveries, No's 201-234, original and updated Orange, original and updated Enterprise and Green Intercity.

The 201 Class has also been released in virtual form as a player driveable locomotive in the Microsoft Train Simulator add-on, "Irish Enterprise North", by Making Tracks, and for OpenBVE by Celtic Trainsim.

References

External links
 Iarnród Éireann Fleet Information website

201 Class
Electro-Motive Division locomotives
Co-Co locomotives
Railway locomotives introduced in 1994
5 ft 3 in gauge locomotives
Diesel-electric locomotives of Ireland
Diesel-electric locomotives of Northern Ireland